Argentina Sono Film S.A.C.I. is an entertainment company based in Buenos Aires that produced many of the major films during the classic period of Argentine cinema from 1933. In its current format, it serves as a production and distribution company.

History

First decade, founding and development
Luis José Moglia Barth, the director of several films in the silent era, made a proposition to Ángel Mentasti, a prominent businessman in the film industry, to direct a sound feature film based around tango; this formed the beginnings of Argentina Sono Film. The name of this film was to be ¡Tango!, in which popular figures, already well known by the public, would sing and dance throughout. The stars which Mentasti recruited were: Azucena Maizani, Luis Sandrini, Libertad Lamarque, Mercedes Simone, Tita Merello, Pepe Arias, Alberto Gómez, Alicia Vignoli, Meneca Tailhade and Juan Sarcione. ¡Tango! thus became the first feature film produced by Argentina Sono Film and also marked the beginning of the sound era in Argentine cinema. Within the field of cinematic historiography, certain scholars suggest that other films, making use of the same technology, had already been finished by the time of ¡Tango!; there is no doubt, however, that ¡Tango! was the first sound film to be exhibited. The same year, Dancing (1933) was directed by Luis José Moglia Barth and was also a musical film based around tango; there are no existing copies of the film.

Selected list
The company has produced over 200 films to date in Argentina.

¡Tango! 
24 Hours in the Life of a Woman
A hierro muere
África ríe
Al toque de clarín
Alenjndra
Almafuerte
Amor a primera vista
Amor en el aire
Amor prohibido
Amor se dice cantando
¡Atraco!
Bajó un ángel del cielo
 Black Ermine
Boína blanca
Brigada explosiva
La caída
Canario rojo
Caídos en el infierno
Chico Viola Não Morreu
Confesión
Convivencia
Corazón de León
Dagli Appennini alle Ande
Dancing
Detrás de un largo muro
Digan lo que digan
Dios se lo pague
Dos tipos con suerte
Educating Niní (1940)
El bote, el río y la gente
El Conde de Montecristo
El dinero de Dios
El Hincha
El juramento de Lagardere
El otro yo de Marcela
El patio de la morocha
El secuestrador
El tango vuelve a París
El tercer beso
El túnel
El vampiro negro
En la ardiente oscuridad
Especialista en señoras
Ésta es mi vida
Extermineitors II, la venganza del dragón
Extermineitors III, La gran pelea final
Fin de mes
Fragata Sarmiento
Graciela
Guacho
El hermano José
Hogar, dulce hogar
Incorregibles
La casa del recuerdo
La despedida
La edad del amor
La Furia
La hermosa mentira
La indeseable
La mejor del colegio
La niña del gato
La orquídea
La Rubia Mireya
La vida color de rosa
Locos suertos en el zoo
Locuras, tiros y mambos
Los Bañeros más locos del mundo
Los extermineitors
Los hermanos corsos
Los matamonstruos en la mansión del terror
Los pilotos más locos del mundo
Los problemas de Papá
Los sobrinos del zorro
Luna Park
Maestro Levita
María Magdalena
Mi marido y mi novio
Más allá del olvido
Más pobre que una laucha
Napoleón
Novia para dos
Obras maestras del terror
Oro bajo
Passport to Rio
Placeres conyugales
Pobre pero honrado
Porteña de corazón
Procesado 1040
Socios para la aventura
Soñar no cuesta nada
 Story of a Bad Woman
Su hermana menor
Todo el año es Navidad
Toscanito y los detectives
Trompada 45
Un tropezón cualquiera da en la vida
Una noche en el Ta Ba Rin
Vacaciones en el otro mundo
Valle negro 
Veraneo en Mar del Plata
Vigilantes y ladrones
Zafra

Film production companies of Argentina
Mass media companies established in 1933
Argentine companies established in 1933